is a 2001 Japanese techno-horror film directed by Kiyoshi Kurosawa. The film was screened in the Un Certain Regard section at the 2001 Cannes Film Festival. The movie was well-received critically and has a cult following. An English-language remake, also titled Pulse, debuted in 2006 and spawned two sequels. The script was also adapted into a novel of the same name by Kurosawa himself.

Plot
The plot centers on ghosts invading the world of the living via the Internet. It features two parallel plotlines that eventually converge. In the first, Michi Kudo (Kumiko Asō) has recently moved to Tokyo and begun working at a shop that sells plants. Her co-workers include Junko Sasano, Toshio Yabe, and Taguchi, who has been missing for several days while working on a computer disk for the shop's sales. Michi goes to Taguchi's apartment and finds him distracted and aloof; while Michi is looking for the disk, she notices Taguchi’s apartment is eerily quiet. She then turns back to speak with Taguchi and finds him dead after hanging himself, his corpse visibly decaying making Michi question who was she talking to initially . Michi and her friends inspect the disk he left behind and discover it contains an image of Taguchi staring into his own computer monitor, on which Taguchi staring into his monitor can be seen - creating an endless series of images. In the other monitor on his desk, they discover a ghostly face staring out into Taguchi's room.

Yabe receives a phone call and hears a distorted voice saying "help me". Upon checking his phone, he sees the same image found on Taguchi's disk. He goes to Taguchi's apartment and sees a black stain on the wall where he hanged himself, as well as a paper with "how to make a forbidden room" (akazu no heya no tsukurikata) written on it. He notices a door sealed with red tape and enters it, where he encounters a ghost. Yabe becomes depressed and tells Michi that he saw something horrible in "the forbidden room".

Michi receives a call like the one Yabe got. She goes check on Yabe and finds a black stain on the wall like the one in Taguchi's apartment. She panics when she realizes Junko has unsealed and entered a "forbidden room". Inside, she witnesses Junko being cornered by a ghost, and rescues her. Junko becomes catatonic from the encounter. She later steps toward the wall and becomes a black stain, which then dissolves and scatters as Michi tries in vain to stop it. Worried, Michi goes to check on her mother, who lives outside Tokyo.

The second plotline follows Ryosuke Kawashima, a university economics student who has recently signed up to a new internet service provider. His computer accesses a website by itself, showing him disturbing images of people alone in dark rooms exhibiting bizarre behavior. That night, Ryosuke wakes up to find his computer on again with the disturbing images displaying and frantically unplugs it. The next day he goes to the university computer lab looking for answers and meets Harue Karasawa (Koyuki), a post-graduate computer science student, who suggests he either bookmark the page or screen capture the images for her to examine. Ryosuke attempts to do so, but finds that his computer will not follow his commands. Instead, a video plays of a man with his head in a plastic bag sitting in a room with the words "HELP ME" written all over the walls.

A graduate student who Harue is working with explains to Ryosuke his theory that the souls of the dead have begun to invade the physical world. Harue confides her lifelong feelings of isolation to Ryosuke, then begins acting strangely, suggesting that ghosts would want to trap humans in their own loneliness rather than kill them. Ryosuke tries to escape with her to a faraway place on the train. However, their train stops, and Harue, seized by a desire to return home, runs away. Upon returning to her apartment, she witnesses the man with the plastic bag shoot himself on her computer. Harue then presses the "enter" key and sees a video of herself in the present moment on the screen. As she embraces the invisible figure watching her, Harue happily says that she is "not alone". When Ryosuke makes it to her apartment, she has vanished, leaving behind a black ash-like residue on the wall.

As people begin vanishing in great numbers, evacuations of Tokyo begin, and a full-scale invasion of the Kanto region by the ghosts is underway. Ryosuke meets Michi in her broken-down car, and after helping her repair it, she goes with him to search for Harue. They find Harue in an abandoned factory, where she shoots herself. When Ryosuke and Michi's car runs out of gas, Ryosuke enters the warehouse to search for fuel, carrying a gas can with him. While searching the warehouse, he accidentally drops the can’s cap, which rolls through the open doorway of a "forbidden room". When he walks inside the room to retrieve it, the door locks behind him and he encounters a ghost who insists that it is "real" and tells him that "death was eternal loneliness". Although he tries to resist the ghost's influence, Ryosuke loses the will to live, and Michi drags him to safety. They drive through a deserted, ravaged Tokyo, encountering apocalyptic scenery as well as an American C-130 Hercules military cargo plane that falls out of the sky and explodes. After locating a small motorboat and travelling into Tokyo Bay, the pair are found and brought aboard a ship departing from Tokyo, crewed by a small group of survivors who tell them that similar events are happening worldwide.

Returning to the first scene of the film, Michi and the captain of the ship talk on the lower deck. As the ship heads for Latin America, the captain encourages Michi, telling her that she is doing the right thing by continuing to live. She returns to her room on the ship, where she sees Ryosuke sitting against the wall with his eyes closed. He fades into a shadow as Michi declares that she has found happiness, being alone with her last friend in the world.

Cast

 Kumiko Asō as Michi Kudo
 Haruhiko Kato as Ryosuke Kawashima
 Koyuki as Harue Karasawa
 Kurume Arisaka as Junko Sasano
 Masatoshi Matsuo as Toshio Yabe
 Shinji Takeda as Yoshizaki
 Jun Fubuki as Michi's mother
 Shun Sugata as Boss
 Kōji Yakusho as Ship Captain
 Show Aikawa as Employee
 Kenji Mizuhashi as Taguchi

Release
Pulse was first released in Japan on February 3, 2001, where it was distributed by Toho.

Distant Horizon purchased worldwide distribution rights to the film from Daiei. The film premiered in the Un Certain Regard category at the Cannes Film Festival.

Home video
The film was released on DVD by Magnolia Home Entertainment on February 21, 2006. Arrow Video published Blu-ray release of the film in July 2017.

As of October 2019, it is included as part of the subscription service run by the BFI.

Critical reception
The review aggregator Rotten Tomatoes gives the film a rating of 74% based on 54 reviews, and a rating average of 6.8/10. The website's critical consensus reads: "A sinister spine-tingling techno-thriller whose artistry lies in the power of suggestion rather than a barrage of blood and guts or horror shop special effects".

AllMovie praised the film, writing: "The first 30 minutes of Kairo is perhaps some of the most unnerving, frightening sequences to come down the pike in a long time". Anita Gates of The New York Times wrote: "There are very few moments in Kiyoshi Kurosawa's fiercely original, thrillingly creepy horror movie that don't evoke a dreamlike dread of the truly unknown". Slant Magazine gave the film four stars out of four: "Kurosawa's movies have a genuinely unnerving effect on the viewer because they deal with the kind of loneliness that exists in an overcrowded world. [...] Pulse is his strongest elucidation of this theme, treating the World Wide Web as a literal snare forging sinewy connections between strangers where the ultimate destination is chaos". The Guardian called it "an incredibly creepy horror film" that, in the same way as Ring, "finds chills in the most dingy and mundane of locales; skillful deployment of grisly little moments and disturbing, cryptic imagery produce the requisite mood of dread and gloom". Film Threat wrote: "What's worse than a horror film that frightens you sleepless is one that disturbs you to depression". The Washington Post commented: "Pulse is best enjoyed if it's not questioned too closely. It lives visually in a way it cannot live intellectually".

Entertainment Weekly was critical of the film, writing "watching Pulse [...] you could almost die of anticipation", commenting that "nothing in the two snail-paced hours [...] makes close to a shred of sense". The Seattle Times criticized the film's storyline and length, writing "while it's rattling your nerves, Pulse leaves your brain wanting more", and The Village Voice called the film "at least half an hour too long".

In 2012, Jaime N Christley of Slant magazine listed the film as one of the greatest of all time. In the early 2010s, Time Out conducted a poll with several authors, directors, actors and critics who have worked within the horror genre to vote for their top horror films. The film was ranked as number 65 on the 2020 version of the same list.

The scene where Yabe encounters a ghost for the first time has received attention for being particularly scary without using jump scares or loud sound effects; Scott Tobias, writing for The AV Club, described it as "arguably the signature sequence in all of J-horror".

See also
 List of ghost films

References

External links
 
 
 
 
 

2001 films
2001 horror films
Films based on horror novels
Films based on Japanese novels
Films directed by Kiyoshi Kurosawa
Japanese ghost films
Japanese horror films
Techno-horror films
2000s Japanese films